Han is a common Chinese surname. The spelling "Han" is based on China's pinyin system and so used throughout Mainland China. Spelling can vary from 'Hon' in Cantonese-speaking areas to 'Hang' in Hainan. It is the 15th name on the Hundred Family Surnames poem.
In 2003, Han (韩) is ranked 25th in China in terms of the number of bearers at around 8 million persons. In 2019 it was the 28th most common surname in Mainland China.

Less common Chinese surnames romanized as Han include: 寒 (Hán) and 汉/漢 (Hàn).

Four Chinese Origins of '韩'

From '姬' surname

'姬' (Jì) is an ancient Chinese surname. It is an alternate surname of the Yellow Emperor (Gongsun Xuanyuan) and the Zhou ruling family. A descendant of King Wu of Zhou, Wan, was given land in Hanyuan. Wan's descendants created the State of Han during the Warring States period. When the state was conquered by Qin in 230 BC, members of the ruling family adopted Han '韩' as their surname.

From the transcription of non-Han names

Non-Han ethnic groups tend to adopt Chinese surnames through the process known as sinicization. During the reforms of Emperor Xiao Wen of Northern Wei, the Xianbei surname 'Dahan', 大汗 (dà hàn) in Chinese, was changed to Han '韩' because the two names sound similar after 'Da' or '大' is dropped. Manchu clan names Hacihuri, Hangiya, Hanja, Hanyan, and Gilate were changed to Han '韩'.

From given name to surname 

The mythical Yellow Emperor had a son Chang Yi (昌意), who had a son with the given name Han Liu (韩流).  Those who claimed to be Han Liu's descendants adopted Han as their surname.

By Imperial Appointment 
The Salar Muslims voluntarily joined the Ming Dynasty. The Salar clan leaders each capitulated to the Ming Dynasty around 1370. The chief of the four upper clans around this time was Han Pao-yuan and Ming granted him office of centurion, it was at this time the people of his four clans took Han as their surname. The other chief Han Shan-pa of the four lower Salar clans got the same office from Ming, and his clans were the ones who took Ma as their surname.

Ma and Han are the two most widespread names among the salar. Ma is a Salar surname for the same reason it is a common Hui surname, Ma substitutes for Muhammad. The upper four clans of the Salar assumed the surname Han and lived west of Xunhua. One of these Salar surnamed Han was Han Yimu, a Salar officer who served under General Ma Bufang. He fought in the Kuomintang Islamic Insurgency in China (1950–1958), leading Salars in a revolt in 1952 and 1958. Han Youwen was another Salar General, who served in the Communist People's Liberation Army.

Notable people with surname 韩/韓

Modern
 Han Dong (韩东/韓東), Chinese member of a South Korean girl group DREAMCATCHER
 Han Dongfang (韩东方/韓東方), human rights activist
 Han Fuju (韩复榘/韓復榘), Kuomintang general
 Han Geng (韩庚/韓庚), singer and actor
 Han Hong (韩红/韓紅), singer and songwriter
 Han Kuo-yu (韩国瑜/韓國瑜), mayor of Kaohsiung
 Han Lao Da (韩劳达/韓勞達), Singaporean playwright
 Han Meilin (韩美林/韓美林), artist
 Han Sai Por (韩少芙/韓少芙), Singaporean sculptor
 Han Shaogong (韩少功/韓少功), novelist
 Han Xiaopeng (韩晓鹏/韓曉鵬), freestyle skier
 Han Xianchu (韩先楚/韓先楚), general in the People's Liberation Army
 Han Xinyun (韩馨蕴/韓馨蘊), tennis player
 Han Youwen (韩有文/韓有文), general in the National Revolutionary Army
 Han Zheng (韩正/韓正), mayor of Shanghai
 Hon Sui Sen (韩瑞生/韓瑞生), Singaporean politician
 Residents of the Cuandixia village

Pre-Modern
 Han Dang (韩当/韓當), general of the Three Kingdoms period
 Han Fei (韩非/韓非), philosopher of the Warring States period
 Han Fu (韩馥/韓馥), warlord of the Eastern Han dynasty
 Han Gan (韩干/韓幹), painter of the Tang dynasty
 Han Guang (韩广/韓廣), ruler of the Kingdom of Liaodong
 Han Hong (韩弘/韓弘), general and statesman of the Tang dynasty
 Han Hao (韩浩/韓浩), general of the Eastern Han dynasty
 Han Shantong (韩山童/韓山童), rebel leader of the Yuan dynasty
 Han Shizhong (韩世忠/韓世忠), general of the Southern Song dynasty
 Han Sui (韓遂), general and warlord of the Eastern Han dynasty
 Han Tuozhou (韩侂胄/韓侂胄), statesman of the Southern Song dynasty
 Han Xiangzi (韩湘子/韓湘子), one of the Eight Immortals
 Han Xin (韩信/韓信), general of the Western Han dynasty
 King Xin of Han (韩王信/韓王信), a vassal ruler under Emperor Gaozu of Han
 Han Yu (韩愈/韓愈), poet and philosopher of the Tang dynasty
 Concubine Han- a Korean concubine of the Chinese Ming dynasty Hongwu emperor

See also 
 Change of Xianbei names to Han names
 List of common Chinese surnames

References

External links 
 

Chinese-language surnames
Individual Chinese surnames